Qowzlujeh or Qvozlujeh, also rendered as Quzlucheh, may refer to:
 Qowzlujeh, Hamadan
 Qowzlujeh, Mahabad, West Azerbaijan Province
 Qowzlujeh, Hamadan